Romela Aleksandër Begaj (born 2 November 1986) is an Albanian weightlifter. On 11 November 2014 in Almaty she became  world champion in the Snatch style for the category up to 63 kg. Previously Begaj represented Albania at the 2008 European Weightlifting Championships where she took home the silver medal. She also represented Albania at 2008 Olympic Games in China where she finished 6th in the under 58 kg category.

In the 2011 World Weightlifting Championships she got bronze medal in snatch.

Begaj, 28, became the first Albanian woman to win a World Championship gold medal by lifting 113 kg in the snatch. However, Begaj failed an anti-doping test for this event and her results will likely be expunged.

2008 Olympic Games in Beijing

References

External links
 
 
 
 

1986 births
Living people
Sportspeople from Tirana
Albanian female weightlifters
Weightlifters at the 2008 Summer Olympics
Weightlifters at the 2012 Summer Olympics
Olympic weightlifters of Albania
Mediterranean Games gold medalists for Albania
Mediterranean Games silver medalists for Albania
Mediterranean Games bronze medalists for Albania
Competitors at the 2005 Mediterranean Games
Competitors at the 2009 Mediterranean Games
Competitors at the 2013 Mediterranean Games
World Weightlifting Championships medalists
Mediterranean Games medalists in weightlifting
European Weightlifting Championships medalists